Jeremiah Davison (1695?–1750?) was an Anglo-Scottish portrait-painter.

Life
Davison was born in England, of Scottish parentage, about 1695. He studied from the works of Sir Peter Lely, and under Joseph van Aken acquired facility in painting satin.

Davison died towards the end of 1745, aged about 50.

Works

Through a Masonic lodge, Davison became acquainted with James Murray, 2nd Duke of Atholl, and painted his portrait. Under the patronage of the Duke and Duchess he went to Scotland, and obtained a good practice as a portrait-painter in Edinburgh, and London.

In 1730 Davison painted the portrait of Frederick, Prince of Wales. At Greenwich Hospital is a full-length portrait by him of Admiral George Byng, 1st Viscount Torrington; in the National Gallery of Scotland is a head of Richard Cooper, the elder; and in the Merchants' Hall, Edinburgh, is a half-length of Elizabeth Macdonald of Largie, wife of Charles Lockhart of Lee and Carnwath. A portrait of Kitty Clive the actress was in Horace Walpole's collection at Strawberry Hill. A group representing James Douglas, 14th Earl of Morton and his family is now in the Scottish National Portrait Gallery.

Notes

External links

Attribution

1695 births
1745 deaths
18th-century English painters
English male painters
18th-century Scottish painters
Scottish male painters
English portrait painters
Scottish portrait painters
18th-century English male artists